Ivan Benediktov (1902–1983) was a Soviet official who served in different posts, including people's commissars for agriculture, then minister of agriculture and Soviet ambassador to India and to Yugoslavia. He was a long-term member of the central committee of the Communist Party.

Early life and education
Benediktov was born in Vichuga, Kineshma district, Kostroma Oblast, on 23 March 1902. In the period 1920-1923 he attended the Pokrovsky workers' faculty in Moscow. From 1923 to 1927 he attended the Faculty of Economics at the Timiryazev Agricultural Academy.

Career
Benediktov was the as deputy chief of the collective farm system in Uzbekistan. In 1930 he became a member of the Communist Party. He was appointed people's commissar of collective farms in the Russian Soviet Federative Socialist Republic (RSFSR) in 1937 and Soviet commissar of agriculture in April 1938. In the latter post Benediktov succeeded Robert Eikhe and was in office until 1943. In 1939 Benediktov was appointed a member of the central committee, and his term ended in 1941. In 1952 he was again made the central committee member which he held until 1971. 

In 1946 Benediktov was appointed minister of agriculture, and his tenure ended in 1953 when he was named Soviet ambassador to India which he held for one year. In 1954 he was again appointed minister of agriculture. Due to criticisms he was removed from the office and appointed to the same post for the RSFSR. In 1959 he was again named the Soviet ambassador to India where he served until 1967. One of the most significant events during his diplomatic service in India was about the defection of Svetlana Alliluyeva, Josef Stalin's daughter. She was there to finalize the funeral ceremony of her common law husband and Indian communist Brajesh Singh by dispersing his ashes into the river Ganges per the Indian traditions. After the ceremony she asked to have an official permission to stay there through the Soviet ambassador, Ivan Benediktov. However, her request was not accepted, and instead, she was ordered to return to the Soviet Union, but she did not return to her native country and defected to the United States. 

Benediktov's term ended in April 1967 shortly after the defection of Svetlana Alliluyeva, and he was appointed Soviet ambassador to Yugoslavia which he held until 1971.

Personal life and death
Benediktov died in Moscow on 30 July 1983 and was buried there in the Novodevichy cemetery.

Awards
Benediktov was the recipient of the following: Order of Lenin (four times), Order of the October Revolution, Order of the Red Banner of Labor (twice) and Order of Friendship of Peoples.

References

External links

1902 births
1983 deaths
Ambassadors of the Soviet Union to India
Ambassadors of the Soviet Union to Yugoslavia
Burials at Novodevichy Cemetery
People from Vichuga
People from Kineshemsky Uyezd
Central Committee of the Communist Party of the Soviet Union members
People's commissars and ministers of the Soviet Union
People's commissars and ministers of the Russian Soviet Federative Socialist Republic
Second convocation members of the Supreme Soviet of the Soviet Union
Fourth convocation members of the Supreme Soviet of the Soviet Union
Fifth convocation members of the Supreme Soviet of the Soviet Union
Members of the Supreme Soviet of the Russian Soviet Federative Socialist Republic, 1938–1947
Recipients of the Order of Lenin
Recipients of the Order of the Red Banner of Labour